Roe district may refer to:

 Mallee (biogeographic region), formerly known as "Roe Botanical District";
 Electoral district of Roe.